Alfred E. Johnson was an anthropologist and archaeologist at the University of Kansas.

Early life and education
Johnson was born in Kansas.

He received his B.A. in anthropology from the University of Kansas and his M.A. and Ph.D. in anthropology from the University of Arizona. His dissertation research focused on Pueblo Indian culture.

Post-graduate career
Johnson joined the faculty of the University of Kansas in 1965.

References

University of Kansas alumni
University of Arizona alumni
University of Kansas faculty
American anthropologists
American archaeologists
Year of birth missing (living people)
Place of birth missing (living people)
Living people